The 2013–14 season will be Al-Minaa's 38th season in the Iraqi Premier League, having featured in all 40 editions of the competition except two.

Squad

Transfers

In

Out
{| class="wikitable"
|-
! Date
! Pos.
! Name
! To
! Fee
|-
| September 2013
| FW
| |  Claude Gnakpa
|  Salgaocar
| –
|-
| September 2013
| FW
|  Alaa Al-Sasi
|  Al-Hilal Al-Sahili
| –
|-
| September 2013
| MF
|  Nawaf Falah
|   Naft Al-Janoob
| –
|-
| September 2013
| FW
|  Ahmed Shershab
|  Najaf
| –
|-
| September 2013
| GK
|  Salam Mottaleb
|  Al-Diwaniyah
| –
|-
| October 2013
| MF
|  Faisal Kadhim
|  Naft Al-Janoob
| –
|-
| October 2013
| FW
|  Nasser Talla Dahilan
|  Naft Maysan
| –
|-
| October 2013
| MF
|  Salam Mohsin
|   Naft Al-Janoob
| –
|-
| October 2013
| MF
|  Hussein Mohsin
|Retired
|
|-
| November 2013
| FW
|   Reda El-Weshi
| Released
|  –
|-
| November 2013
| DF
|   Rafael Safaryan
| Released
|  –
|-
| March 2014
| FW
| Saidou Sandaogo
| Released
|  –
|-

Technical staff
{| class="wikitable"
|-
! Position
! Name
|-
| Coach
|  Jamal Ali
|-
|  Assistant coach
|  Abbas Obeid
|-
|  Assistant coach
|  Ammar Hussein
|-
| Fitness coach
|  Ali Lafta
|-
| Goalkeeping coach
|  Aqeel Abdul Muhsin
|-
| Club doctor
|  Abdul Abbas Jabbar

Board members

Club

Kits
Supplier: Uhlsport

Stadium
During the previous season, the stadium of Al-Mina'a demolished. A company will build a new stadium that will be completed in 2015. Since they can't play their games at Al Mina'a Stadium, they will be playing at Az-Zubayr Olympic Stadium during this season.

Friendlies

Opening of Basra Sports City

Premier League

League table

Summary table

Matches

Note: Iraq Football Association has decided to end the league (not canceled) with the adoption of the last position of the standings for the day 18/06/2014 as the final order of the Iraqi League teams.

Goalscorers

Last updated: 10 June 2014

Sources
 Iraqi League 2013/2014
 Al-Minaa SC: Transfers and News
 Iraqia Sport TV

Al-Mina'a SC seasons
Al Mina